The Audio Injected Soul is the second album by Danish metal band Mnemic. It has gone on to sell almost 35,000 copies in North America.

This is the last album to feature former singer Michael Bøgballe who left the band exactly one year after the release of the album.

Track listing

AM3D technology
The tracks "The Audio Injection" and "Deathbox" are the only two tracks from the album to include the AM3D technology, developed by Mnemic themselves. The back and in the inlay of the album states: "The AM3D positional headphone technology presents a way of improving the sound experience. Using binaural techniques, the sound is processed to localize a single sound to a specific location in three-dimensional space around the listener." The German edition of the album does not include the AM3D technology, resulting in the introduction ("The Audio Injection") being removed, and the track "Deathbox" being edited.

Personnel
 Michael Bøgballe – vocals
 Mircea Gabriel Eftemie – guitar, keyboards
 Rune Stigart – guitar, keyboards
 Tomas Koefoed – bass
 Brian Rasmussen – drums

References

2004 albums
Mnemic albums
Nuclear Blast albums
Albums produced by Tue Madsen